Abdoh Besisi (11 December 1977 – 28 February 2023) was a Saudi footballer who played as a goalkeeper for Al-Ahli, Al-Ansar, Al-Orobah, and Ohod. 

Besisi began his career at Al-Ahli as a goalkeeper where he spent twelve years at the club. He joined Al-Ansar in July 2008 spending five years at the club and helping them gain promotion to the Pro League in 2011. He had a brief stint at Al-Orobah where he spent only one season at the club before joining Ohod in 2014. He spent five years at the club and helped them gain promotion to the Pro League in 2017. He announced his retirement from football on 14 May 2019. Following his retirement, Besisi worked as a part of the technical staff at Ohod until his death on 28 February 2023.

References

1977 births
2023 deaths
Saudi Arabian footballers
Association football goalkeepers
Saudi First Division League players
Saudi Professional League players
Saudi Second Division players
Al-Ahli Saudi FC players
Al-Orobah FC players
Al-Ansar FC (Medina) players
Ohod Club players